Bright Silas (born 19 November 1992) is a Nigerian professional footballer for Kano Pillars. He currently plays as an attacking midfielder for the Kano Pillars. He formerly played for Plateau United F.C. in 2016. In April 2017, he signed a deal with Enugu Rangers. On 20 June 2019 El Entag El Harby SC Of Egypt signed Silas from Enugu Rangers. On 1 July 2019 Kano Pillars signed Silas and offered hiam a deal.

Silas has also played at the CAF Confederation Cup in 2018.

References 

Living people
1992 births
Nigerian footballers
Plateau United F.C. players
Rangers International F.C. players
Association football midfielders